Rodrigo Hugo Crexell (born 5 February 1968 in Santa Fe Province) is a former Argentine rugby union player. He played as a scrum-half.

Crexell played for Club Atlético del Rosario, in the Argentine Championship.

He had 14 caps for Argentina, since the 20-18 win over Ireland, at 27 October 1990, in Dublin, in a friendly match, scoring 5 tries, 2 conversions and 1 penalty, 32 points on aggregate. He was called for the 1995 Rugby World Cup, playing in all the three matches and scoring a try. His last match was at the 52-37 win over Uruguay, at 8 October 1995, in Posadas, for the South American Rugby Championship, where he scored one of the eight tries of the "Pumas", in a hard-fought match.

References

External links

1968 births
Living people
Argentine rugby union players
Sportspeople from Santa Fe Province
Argentina international rugby union players
Club Atlético del Rosario rugby union players
Rugby union scrum-halves